John Robison may refer to:

John Robison (physicist) (1739–1805), Scottish physicist, inventor, and conspiracy theorist
Sir John Robison (inventor) (1778–1843), his son, Scottish inventor and writer
John J. Robison, 19th-century Michigan politician
John Elder Robison (born 1956), author of the 2007 memoir, Look Me in the Eye: My Life with Asperger's

See also
John Robinson (disambiguation)